Audit Commission can refer to:
Audit Commission (Hong Kong)
Commission of Audit (Macau)
Commission on Audit of the Philippines
Audit Commission (United Kingdom)